Vulnerability management is the "cyclical practice of identifying, classifying, prioritizing, remediating, and mitigating"  software vulnerabilities. Vulnerability management is integral to computer security and network security, and must not be confused with vulnerability assessment.

Vulnerabilities can be discovered with a vulnerability scanner, which analyzes a computer system in search of known vulnerabilities, such as open ports, insecure software configurations, and susceptibility to malware infections. They may also be identified by consulting public sources, such as NVD, or subscribing to a commercial vulnerability alerting service such as Symantec's DeepSight Vulnerability Datafeed  or Accenture's Vulnerability Intelligence Service.  Unknown vulnerabilities, such as a zero-day, may be found with fuzz testing. Fuzzy testing can identify certain kinds of vulnerabilities, such as a buffer overflow with relevant test cases. Such analysis can be facilitated by test automation. In addition, antivirus software capable of heuristic analysis may discover undocumented malware if it finds software behaving suspiciously (such as attempting to overwrite a system file).

Correcting vulnerabilities may variously involve the installation of a patch, a change in network security policy, reconfiguration of software, or educating users about social engineering.

Project vulnerability management 
Project vulnerability is the project's susceptibility to being subject to negative events, the analysis of their impact, and the project's capability to cope with negative events. Based on Systems Thinking, project systemic vulnerability management takes a holistic vision, and proposes the following process:

                             1.           Project vulnerability identification.

                             2.           Vulnerability analysis.

                             3.           Vulnerability response planning.

                             4.           Vulnerability controlling – which includes implementation, monitoring, control, and lessons learned.

Coping with negative events is done, in this model, through: 

 resistance – the static aspect, referring to the capacity to withstand instantaneous damage, and 
 resilience – the dynamic aspect, referring to the capacity to recover in time. 

Redundancy is a specific method to increase resistance and resilience in vulnerability management. 

Antifragility is a concept introduced by Nassim Nicholas Taleb to describe the capacity of systems to not only resist or recover from adverse events, but also to improve because of them. Antifragility is similar to the concept of positive complexity proposed by Stefan Morcov.

See also 
Application security
Full disclosure
Long-term support
IT risk
Risk management
Project management
Project complexity

References

External links 
"Implementing a Vulnerability Management Process". SANS Institute. 
Computer security procedures
Security compliance